Norbert Shamuyarira (born 1962) is a Zimbabwean sculptor.  

A native of Chinhoyi, Shamuyarira lost his mother at the age of nine; soon after her death, his father deserted the family.  His brother later committed suicide.  He started sculpting in 1979, working for four years with Bernard Takawira in Chitungwiza.

References

1962 births
Living people
Zimbabwean sculptors
People from Chinhoyi
20th-century sculptors
21st-century sculptors